Bolton v Madsen, is a High Court of Australia case that dealt with section 90 of the Australian Constitution, which prohibits States from levying excise duty.

This case followed Dennis Hotels Pty Ltd v Victoria. It upheld the broad approach to excise, that is, excise duties are taxes on goods at some stage in their production or distribution before they reach consumers. Furthermore, the case supported the criterion of liability approach, that is, a tax must be applied directly to the goods. The judges gave some guidance on the required relationship; the relationship is satisfied "if the tax is calculated by reference to the quantity or value of goods produced or dealt with in the relevant period", as summarised by Mason J in Hematite Petroleum Pty Ltd v Victoria. This approach, of ensuring that the burden is down the line ensures that it is conformant with the original description of excise in Peterswald v Bartley. The mere fact that there was an increase in the price of goods is insufficient.

See also 

 Section 90 of the Constitution of Australia
 Australian constitutional law

References 

 Winterton, G. et al. Australian federal constitutional law: commentary and materials, 1999. LBC Information Services, Sydney.

High Court of Australia cases
1963 in Australian law
Australian constitutional law
Excise in the Australian Constitution cases
1963 in case law